Whitharral Independent School District is a public school district based in the community of Whitharral, Texas (USA).

The district has one school that serves students in grades kindergarten through twelve.

Academic achievement
In 2009, the school district was rated "recognized" by the Texas Education Agency.

Special programs

Athletics
Whitharral High School plays six-man football.

See also

List of school districts in Texas

References

External links
Whitharral ISD

School districts in Hockley County, Texas